is the professional name of , a Japanese author. She has won the Akutagawa Prize and the Tanizaki Prize, she has been named a Person of Cultural Merit, and her work has been adapted for film.

Biography 
Takagi was born Nobuko Tsuruta in Yamaguchi Prefecture on April 9, 1946. She graduated from the Junior College of Tokyo Women's University, after which she worked at a publishing company for two years, married her first husband in 1971, and had a son. Takagi moved to Fukuoka in 1974, divorced her first husband in 1978 and married her second husband, a lawyer, in 1980.

Takagi started writing love stories and made her fiction debut in 1980 with Sono hosoki michi (That Narrow Road). Hikari idaku tomo yo, a story about the emotional lives of two high school girls, won the 90th Akutagawa Prize. 

Subsequent works continued to explore themes of romantic love in many forms, including innocent love, married love, extramarital affairs, and love triangles. Her 1994 novel  won the inaugural Shimase Award for Love Stories. Other examples include the 1993 novel , about two former lovers reunited when their daughters from their current marriages become injured in the same car accident, the 1999 novel , which won the 35th Tanizaki Prize and was later translated into English by Deborah Stuhr Iwabuchi, and the 2000 novel , about two lovers who find piece of music containing a hidden code that will help Romania achieve political freedom. In 2004 Takagi published , a novelized version of her autobiography that was later adapted into the 2009 movie Mai Mai Miracle starring Mayuko Fukuda. In 2011 her story  won the 36th Kawabata Yasunari Literature Prize. 

In 2008 Takagi was a Special Guest Professor at Kyushu University. In 2018 she was named a Person of Cultural Merit. Takagi is an Akutagawa Prize selection committee member. She continues to live in Fukuoka.

Recognition 
 1984 90th Akutagawa Prize (1983下) for 
 1994 Shimase Literary Prize for Love Stories for 
 1999 35th Tanizaki Prize for 
 2011 36th Kawabata Yasunari Literature Prize
 2018 Person of Cultural Merit

Bibliography

Selected works in Japanese 
 , Shinchosha, 1984, 
 , Kodansha, 1994, 
 , Bungeishunjū, 1999, 
 , Magajin Hausu, 2004, 
 , Shinchosha, 2011,

Selected works in English

References

External links
 Nobuko Takagi at J'Lit Books from Japan

1946 births
Living people
People from Yamaguchi Prefecture
Writers from Yamaguchi Prefecture
Akutagawa Prize winners
Academic staff of Kyushu University
20th-century Japanese novelists
20th-century Japanese women writers
21st-century Japanese novelists
21st-century Japanese women writers
Japanese women novelists